Jeremiah Solomon Sumari (2 March 1943 – 19 January 2012) was a Tanzanian CCM politician and Member of Parliament for Arumeru East constituency from 2005 to 2012.

References

1943 births
2012 deaths
Chama Cha Mapinduzi MPs
Tanzanian MPs 2005–2010
Tanzanian MPs 2010–2015